Loose... is an album by saxophonist Willis Jackson which was recorded in 1963 and released on the Prestige label.

Reception

Allmusic awarded the album 3 stars stating "Willis with Carl Wilson on Hammond organ".

Track listing 
 "Secret Love" (Sammy Fain, Paul Francis Webster) – 5:00
 "When My Dreamboat Comes Home" (Cliff Friend, Dave Franklin) – 6:56
 "She's My Love" (Willis Jackson) – 5:53
 "Y'All" (Jackson)
 "After Hours" (Avery Parrish) – 10:29
 "What Will I Tell My Heart" (Irving Gordon, Jack Lawrence, Peter Tinturin) – 5:36

Personnel 
Willis Jackson – tenor saxophone
Frank Robinson – trumpet
Carl Wilson – organ
Bill Jones – guitar
Joe Hadrick – drums

References 

Willis Jackson (saxophonist) albums
1963 albums
Prestige Records albums
Albums produced by Ozzie Cadena
Albums recorded at Van Gelder Studio